Sasang Station is the name of several railroad stations in Busan, South Korea.

 Sasang station (Korail)
 Sasang station (Busan Metro)